Rush Hour 3 Soundtrack the original motion picture soundtrack for the movie Rush Hour 3 was released on August 8, 2007, on CD and audio cassette from New Line Records and Columbia Records.

Janet Jackson was initially approached to record the soundtrack's theme.

Track listing
"Do Me, Baby" - Performed by Prince & Chris Tucker
"Less Than an Hour (Theme Song from Rush Hour 3)" - Performed by Nas & Cee-Lo Green
"War [Extended Version]" - Performed by Edwin Starr, Jackie Chan, Chris Tucker and Adrienne Bailon
"(Your Love Keeps Lifting Me) Higher and Higher" - Performed by Jackie Wilson
"Bonnie and Clyde" - Performed by Serge Gainsbourg and Brigitte Bardot
"The Stoinked Quay (Original Score)" - Composed by Lalo Schifrin
"New Line Cinema Theme (Original Score)" - Composed by Lalo Schifrin
"Shaolin Fight" (Original Score) - Composed by Mark Mothersbaugh
"Adrienne Bailon!" (Original Score) - Composed and Conducted by Lalo Schifrin & Mark Mothersbaugh
"The Closer I Get to You" - Performed by Luther Vandross, Beyonce, Jackie Chan, and Chris Tucker

References 

Hip hop soundtracks
2007 soundtrack albums
Albums produced by Warryn Campbell
Albums produced by the Neptunes
Rhythm and blues soundtracks
Albums produced by Focus...
Rush Hour (franchise)
Action film soundtracks
Comedy film soundtracks